The Salinas Grandes are located in the north in the provinces of Jujuy and Salta (in Argentina), at an average altitude of  above sea level.

Overview
The region is of industrial importance for its sodium and potassium. It is also being explored for the lithium brine beneath its salt,  of it were awarded to LSC Lithium for development. The exploitation of lithium reserves drew criticism from Indigenous community leaders for the steep decline in ground water levels, threatening local farming. Also, they regarded their right to have use and control over the land as violated.

References

Salt flats of Argentina